The canton of Bergerac-1 is an administrative division of the Dordogne department, southwestern France. Its borders were modified at the French canton reorganisation which came into effect in March 2015. Its seat is in Bergerac.

It consists of the following communes:

Bergerac (partly)
Cours-de-Pile
Creysse
Lamonzie-Montastruc
Lembras
Mouleydier
Queyssac
Saint-Germain-et-Mons
Saint-Nexans
Saint-Sauveur

References

Cantons of Dordogne